Bogard Township is one of ten townships in Daviess County, Indiana. As of the 2010 census, its population was 1,473 and it contained 395 housing units.

History
Bogard Township was organized on 9 May 1820.  Among its earliest settlers was North Carolina native Elias Myers, who arrived in 1816 and purchased  of land in the following year.  Its namesake was a W. Bogard, who was a victim of an attack by Indians.

The McCall Family Farmstead was added to the National Register of Historic Places in 2013.

Geography

Unincorporated towns
 Cornettsville
 Epsom
(This list is based on USGS data and may include former settlements.)

Adjacent townships
 Elmore Township (north)
 Madison Township (northeast)
 Van Buren Township (east)
 Barr Township (southeast)
 Washington Township (southwest)
 Steele Township (west)

Cemeteries
The township contains five cemeteries: Concord, Cornettsville, Humphries, Tolberts Chapel and Wells.

References
 
 United States Census Bureau cartographic boundary files

External links

 Indiana Township Association
 United Township Association of Indiana

Townships in Daviess County, Indiana
Townships in Indiana
1820 establishments in the United States
Populated places established in 1820